Harry Marsh (born 17 April 1926) is an English chemist. His professional focus is carbon science. 

Born on 17 April 1926 in West Durham, England, Marsh spent much of his career at the Northern Carbon Research Laboratories of the University of Newcastle upon Tyne. His research investigated the structure and adsorptive properties of carbons. At the 2006 meeting of the International Carbon Society he received their lifetime achievement award.

As of 2016, Marsh was living in Whitley Bay.

Publications

References

1926 births
Living people
British scientists
Carbon scientists